The 2000 Summer Olympics included individual and team women's rhythmic gymnastics events. The gold medal for the team event was won by the Russian team, and that for the individual event by Yulia Barsukova of Russia.

Individual All-around Qualification

Final Qualifiers

Preliminaries
In total, 24 gymnasts from 19 countries competed in the qualification round. Top 10 gymnasts would advance to final.

Group All-around Qualification

Final Qualifiers

Team Rosters

Preliminaries
10 teams participated in the Preliminary round, the top eight teams would advance to the final.

References

Gymnastics at the 2000 Summer Olympics
2000 in women's gymnastics